The University of North Dakota Historic District is a  area in Grand Forks, North Dakota that was listed as a historic district in the National Register of Historic Places  on January 13, 2010.

The district is located on the University of North Dakota campus and neighboring streets. It includes 56 contributing properties. The area also includes 17 non-contributing buildings and three non-contributing structures.

While it is considered to retain a cohesive design, the district demonstrates changes in education from the 1880s, when the campus was first built, through the years after World War II. The district has dates of significance in 1883, 1922, and 1949. Some work within the area was designed by architect Joseph Bell DeRemer.  The district includes Late 19th and 20th Century Revivals architecture.

See also
 North Dakota State University District, in Fargo, also NRHP-listed
 Valley City State University Historic District, in Valley City, also NRHP-listed

References

Further reading
 

University and college buildings on the National Register of Historic Places in North Dakota
Geography of Grand Forks County, North Dakota
Historic districts on the National Register of Historic Places in North Dakota
Joseph Bell DeRemer buildings
National Register of Historic Places in Grand Forks, North Dakota
University of North Dakota
University and college campuses in North Dakota